WALH-LP was a low-power FM broadcasting station licensed to Wilmington, Ohio, at 106.7 MHz, serving Clinton County. It has ceased on air broadcasts after a snafu with the FCC and subsequent death of the principal owner of the radio station.

WALH aired live local programming and classic hits as "Wilmington's Greatest Hits" from the 1960s, 70s and 80s since its debut which took place on the web from its online stream on Saturday, June 6, 2015 and on the air on June 8, 2015, at 12 noon local time.

Its studios are located at 12 West Main St. in downtown Wilmington which now operates as an online station and is now branded by its website URL.

Programming
 Local news and weather is aired on weekdays in addition to "Mutual Radio News."
 John Cohmer and Dennis Mattingly co-host the weekday morning program Good Morning Wilmington.
 Cohmer also hosts the live Saturday evening program Back To The Blues.

Call sign history
The WALH call sign was used from 1985 to 2013 on the now defunct WNGM in Mountain City, Georgia.

References

External links
Official website (with streaming audio)
Query the FCC's FM station database for WALH-LP
Technical data of WALH-LP from fccdata dot org

ALH-LP
ALH-LP
Clinton County, Ohio
Community radio stations in the United States